Pyrgotis arcuata is a species of moth of the family Tortricidae. It is endemic to New Zealand.

The wingspan is 15–16 mm. The forewings are whitish, mixed with pale ochreous and with reddish-ochreous fasciae, which become blackish on the margins. The hindwings are whitish grey, suffused and spotted with pale fuscous.

The larvae feed on Dacrycarpus dacrydioides.

References

Moths described in 1915
Tortricinae
Moths of New Zealand
Endemic fauna of New Zealand
Endemic moths of New Zealand